Cirsium oleraceum, the cabbage thistle or Siberian thistle, is a species of thistle in the genus Cirsium within the family Asteraceae, native to central and eastern Europe and Asia, where it grows in wet lowland soils.

Cirsium oleraceum is a herbaceous perennial plant growing to 1.5 m tall, the stems unbranched or with only a very few branches. The leaves are broad and ovoid, with a weakly spiny margin, being pinnatipartite. The flowers are produced in dense flower heads which are 2.5–4 cm diameter, pale yellow, but sometimes tinged pink.

Usage
For cooking: 
In salads the young stems and leaves are edible, and cultivated for food in Japan and India.

References

oleraceum
Flora of Europe
Flora of Asia
Plants described in 1753
Taxa named by Carl Linnaeus